The Cooloola snake-skink (Ophioscincus cooloolensis)  is a species of skink found in Queensland in Australia.

References

Ophioscincus
Reptiles described in 1985
Taxa named by Allen Eddy Greer
Taxa named by Harold Cogger